Radhika Vidyadhar Kulkarni (born 1956) is a retired Indian and American operations researcher, and the 2022 president of INFORMS.

The Bechhofer–Kulkarni selection procedure or Bechhofer–Kulkarni stopping rule, a stopping rule for maximization in Bernoulli processes, is named after her work with her doctoral advisor, Robert E. Bechhofer.

Education and career
After earning a master's degree in mathematics at IIT Delhi, Kularni went to Cornell University intending to do doctoral research in pure mathematics, but switched to operations research after taking a mathematical programming course in her first year. She earned a second master's degree in 1979 and completed her Ph.D. in 1981. Her doctoral supervisor was Robert E. Bechhofer.

She worked for 35 years at the SAS Institute, including ten years as Vice President of Advanced Analytics R&D. She is the 2022 president of the Institute for Operations Research and the Management Sciences (INFORMS).

Recognition
Kulkarni was the 2006 winner of the WORMS Award for the Advancement of Women in OR/MS of INFORMS. In 2014 she was named a Fellow of INFORMS.

Personal life
Kulkarni married Vidyadhar Kulkarni, another student of operations research at Cornell and later the chair of Statistics and Operations Research at the University of North Carolina.

References

1956 births
Living people
IIT Delhi alumni
Cornell University alumni
American mathematicians
American women mathematicians
American operations researchers
Indian mathematicians
Indian women mathematicians
Indian operations researchers
Fellows of the Institute for Operations Research and the Management Sciences